The Home of Peace Cemetery ( Beit Kvarot Beit Shalom) is a Jewish cemetery in Los Angeles, California.

Location
It is located at 4334 Whittier Boulevard west of Interstate 710 in East Los Angeles, California. It is across from  Calvary Catholic Cemetery and next to Beth Israel Cemetery and Mount Zion Cemetery.

History
In 1853, the first and oldest Jewish cemetery in Los Angeles was established in Chavez Ravine, near the present-day Dodger Stadium. In 1901, Kaspare Cohn donated 30 acres (12.1 ha) of land for the establishment of this cemetery. The bodies interred at Chavez Ravine were moved to East Los Angeles's Home of Peace Memorial Park between 1902 and 1910. There are a number of famous rabbis buried here, and amongst others a few celebrities from the entertainment industry as well.

Notable interments

 Inez Asher (1911–2006), television writer and novelist
 Burt Baskin (1913–1967), business magnate and co-founder of Baskin-Robbins
 David Berman (1903–1957), Jewish mobster who ran the Las Vegas Flamingo Hotel, one-time partner with Bugsy Siegel
 Susan Berman (1945–2000), author, journalist, daughter of David Berman
 Thelma Bernstein (1910–2006), actress
 Fanny Brice (1891–1951), actress and comedian (transferred to Westwood Village Memorial Park Cemetery in 1999)
 Boake Carter (1900–1944), journalist
 Lou Clayton (1890–1950), entertainer
 Harry Einstein (1904–1958), comedian
 Leo F. Forbstein (1892–1948), composer and conductor
 Mack Gordon (1904–1959), composer and lyricist
 Don Hartman (1900–1958), director
 Herman W. Hellman (1843–1906), German-born Jewish businessman, banker, and real estate investor
 Curly Howard (1903–1952), actor, comedian, member of The Three Stooges
 Shemp Howard (1895–1955), actor, comedian, member of The Three Stooges
 David A. Karnofsky (1914–1969), medical oncologist
 Carl Laemmle (1867–1939), film executive, founder of Universal Pictures; he created the "Star" system
 Carl Laemmle Jr. (1908–1979), son of Carl Laemmle and studio executive
 Carla Laemmle (1909–2014), niece of Carl Laemmle and actress
 Solomon Lazard (1827–1916), 19th Century merchant and community leader
 Ruth Harriet Louise (1903–1940), photographer
 Edgar Magnin (1890–1984), rabbi and spiritual leader
 Louis B. Mayer (1885–1957), a founder of the MGM film studios
 Raymond Moscatel (1931–2022), Seattle University Basketball player beat The Harlem Globe Trotters in 1952
 Carmel Myers (1899–1980), actress
 Kurt Neumann (1908–1958), motion picture director and producer
 Harry Rapf (1880–1949), motion picture producer and studio executive
 Joseph Rosenberg (1881–1971) Bank of America executive vice president and motion picture lender
 Mark Sandrich (1900–1945), motion picture director
 Jack H. Skirball (1896–1985), rabbi, film producer, real estate developer and philanthropist
 Abe Stern (1888–1951), motion picture producer
 Charles Vidor (1900–1959), motion picture director
 Harry Warner (1881–1958), co-founder of Warner Brothers film studios
 Jack L. Warner (1892–1978), co-founder of Warner Brothers film studios, founder of Warner Bros. Records
 Sam Warner (1887–1927), co-founder and first CEO of Warner Brothers film studios
 Conrad Wells (born Abraham Fried) (1892–1930), cinematographer
 Osher Zilberstein (1888–1973), rabbi

References

External links
 

Cemeteries in Los Angeles
Jewish cemeteries in California
Jews and Judaism in Los Angeles
Eastside Los Angeles
1901 establishments in California